A cold email is an unsolicited e-mail that is sent to a receiver without prior contact. It could also be defined as the email equivalent of cold calling. Cold emailing is a subset of email marketing and differs from transactional and warm emailing.

Cold email is a personalized, one-to-one message targeted at a specific individual. Its aim is to get into a business conversation with that individual, rather than to promote a product or a service to the masses.
Cold email, according to its proponents, is not spam. However, if certain steps are not followed, it may be treated as spam by spam filters or reported by the recipients.

Email deliverability 

Email deliverability is the percentage of emails that got successfully delivered to the inbox, instead of getting blocked or classified as spam.

Email deliverability is not the same as email delivery. Email delivery is the percentage of emails that got successfully delivered to the recipient's email address, regardless of whether it is the main inbox or any other folder, including spam.

Email deliverability is especially important for cold email senders because their goal is to have their email delivered to the recipients' main inbox.

Factors decreasing email deliverability 
Low email deliverability may result from:

Bad domain reputation 

A domain reputation is a sending reputation for a specific domain name. A domain may lose its reputation if the emails are being sent in large quantities at once and with too high frequency. The recipient's email server may consider such behavior as spamming and blocklist the domain used for sending emails.

A domain may be also blocklisted if spam filters detect spam words in the subject line or the email content or an attempt to use other spamming techniques.

A domain's age is an important factor in determining a domain's reputation. A new domain has a neutral reputation by default. However, its activity is closely monitored by spam filters. If the email providers detect suspicious use of a domain, for example, sending a big number of emails in a short period of time, any such activity will be flagged and the domain may lose its reputation. To use a domain for cold email outreach, it is recommended to warm it up first.

Bad server IP reputation 

IP reputation is the sending reputation of an individual IP. Each email sender is assigned an IP address. If an IP address is associated with spam activities, its reputation gets harmed.

An IP address may be shared or dedicated. The reputation of a shared IP address depends on all the users who are assigned to it. If one of the users sends emails marked as spam by spam filters or email recipients, the shared IP address's reputation is harmed. The reputation of a dedicated IP address depends solely on the specific user to whom it is assigned.

A new IP address has a neutral reputation and needs to be warmed up first in order to build up a good reputation.

Emails sent by the IP address that has a bad reputation are placed in the spam folder. Ultimately, the IP address associated with spam activity may be blocked by the Internet Service Provider.

How to warm-up servers IPs

It is easier to establish a good reputation as a new sender.
IP warm-up age is the main factor to make a good reputation for your server.
You can set a limit on your server to:

 1 day limit - 20 email/hr
 2 day limit - 30 email/hr
 3 day limit - 45 email/hr
 4 day limit - 68 email/hr
 5 day limit - 102 email/hr
 6 day limit - 153 email/hr
 7 day limit - 229 email/hr

Bad email address reputation 

An email address can be appointed with a bad or good reputation based on its sending history. If the emails are treated as spam by spam filters or reported by the recipients, the email address loses its reputation and further emails are placed into the spam folder or are entirely blocked by the Internet Service Provider.

Email address, similarly to a domain or IP address, requires a warm-up process before it can be used for sending cold email campaigns.

No SPF and DKIM records set up on a domain's DNS server 

Both SPF and DKIM records protect the domain from email spoofing and phishing attacks.

SPF record authenticates the email message sent from an authorized domain's DNS server on which the SPF is set up.

DKIM record affixes a digital signature linked to a domain name to each outgoing email. It ensures that the message was sent from an authorized domain's DNS server.

Setting up both DKIM and SPF on a domain's DNS server positively influences domain reputation.

Exceeding the email provider’s sending limits 

Each email provider has its own email sending limits that can be found on their websites. The limits may be daily, hourly, or sometimes even per minute. Exceeding the limits may result in blocking the email account for a time period determined by an email host.

Problems with email content 

 Spam words: After the recipient's server receives the email and checks several factors, such as domain and IP reputation, the email content and subject line are evaluated by spam filters. There are specific words, usually overused by the spammers, that alarm spam filters, and the message is treated as spam. The anti-spam software is continuously analyzing and modifying the spam word list based on user's feedback and behavior, such as marking specific emails as spam or retrieving them from a spam folder.
 Misleading subject line: Subject lines that aren’t relevant to the email body may cause the recipients to feel misled. They may mark such messages as spam, thus damaging the domain and email address reputation.
 Lack of personalization: The recipients may report the emails as spam if they do not consider the message relevant or valuable to them. Personalization adds uniqueness to each message. Identical and generic emails are not only suspicious to humans, but also to spam filters.
 Extensive use of HTML, GIFs, pictures, or videos: Emails, which include images, GIFs, or videos may be treated as suspicious by the spam filters. Replacing text with a picture in the content of an email has been a common practice of spammers who want to con spam filters and avoid spam word detection by optical character recognition. Too complex or broken HTML code in the email body may cause the message to display incorrectly, thus the message may be considered a phishing attempt or spam and may get reported as such by the recipient.
 Attachments: Emails with attachments sent from an unknown sender raise the recipients’ suspicion because such files are often identified with malware and computer viruses.
 Links and tracking: Too many links in a message may be considered suspicious by both spam filters and the recipients. Spammers tend to avoid using spam words in the email body by including links instead. If a sender includes a link to a non-trustworthy source, it can trigger SPAM filters. Many people use pixel-tracking technology to find out if their emails had been opened. The way this technology works, a transparent image that is the size of one pixel is placed somewhere in the email body. When someone opens the email they send a request to the server where the image is located in order to download that image. This download request is how the sender knows that their email was opened. Even though this technology is used by the majority of businesses that send a large number of emails, it has its downside. SPAM filters are created to protect the user from any unwanted content. Because of this, some people use filters that block emails containing transparent or the same color as background images. This is why sometimes email tracking can trigger SPAM filters.

Sending volume and frequency 

Sending volume is connected with the email provider's sending limit. The email provider determines the number of emails that can be sent per minute or hour. If too many emails are sent in a given period of time the email provider may block the sending process.

Also, if the number of emails sent increases significantly over a certain amount of time, it may be a sign for spam filters that the emails are not sent manually. Any non-human behavior alarms the spam filters, which results in the emails being placed in a spam folder.

High hard bounce rate 

Sending emails to a big number of invalid or non-existent email addresses results in a high hard bounce rate, which in turn alarms the mailbox providers who may block the sender.

High soft bounce rate 

Soft bounces take place when an email is turned back before reaching the recipient's server, hence, it is not delivered to their mailbox. The reason for a soft bounce is often a temporary technical issue with the recipient's mailbox, such as a server's failure or a full inbox.

Good Open rate for Cold Email 
If a cold outreach campaign has a 50% open rate, it is considered successful. The stats can't be tampered with, and anything below 50% suggests the campaigns need to be modified.

Rules and regulations
Below are the summaries of chosen data protection legislation and laws restricting the use of unsolicited emails. A complete list of internal rules and regulations around the world can be found here.

GDPR 
The General Data Protection Regulation aims primarily to give the European Union citizens control over their personal data and to simplify the regulatory environment for international business.

All the individuals who send cold emails to the citizens of the EU are required to comply with the GDPR because they collect and process personal data, in this context, an email address connected to an identifiable individual at minimum.

In order to respect the GDPR while sending cold emails, an individual should abide by the specific principles:

 all the actions taken to build an email list should be legal, fair, and transparent;
 all the personal data collected must be adequate and relevant to the purpose of its processing;
 it is the data processor's responsibility to ensure that the data processed is accurate and up-to-date at all times;
 the personal data should only be stored for the time necessary for the purpose of its processing. Individuals whose data is processed should be enabled to exercise their right to be forgotten and a right to assist in data deletion;
 data administrator is responsible for the security of the personal data being processed. The data must not be shared with any third party without a clear consent of data owners.

CCPA 
The California Consumer Privacy Act regulates the ways personal information of California Citizens is used by businesses that get their revenue from selling consumer's personal data. CCPA focuses on data collection and privacy and gives California Citizens:

 a right to be informed about what kind of information is collected about them and how it is processed;
 a right to request information erasure unless the information is necessary to provide a service;
 a right to object to the sale of their personal information.

CAN-SPAM Act 
The CAN-SPAM Act set first national standards for sending commercial emails in the USA. According to the CAN-SPAM Act:

 every email recipient should have a right to opt-out from getting unwanted emails. Cold email senders should respect the recipient's request to be deleted from their contacts;
 the “from” line should be accurate;
 the subject line should be relevant to the content of an email;
 the sender's physical address should be clearly visible in the content of an email or a signature.

Canada's Anti-Spam Legislation (CASL) 

The CASL gives the citizens of Canada the right to:

 request not to get further emails from a particular sender;
 know the identity and physical address of a sender;
 refuse or withdraw the consent to get the emails from a particular sender;
 know the nature and purpose of an email.

Australian Spam Act 
The Spam Act regulates in what cases commercial emails, including cold emails, can be sent and what must be included in the content. It states that commercial emails:

 cannot be sent without the recipient's clear or inferred consent;
 must contain a name and contact details of a sender;
 must contain a clear way to opt-out from receiving them;
 must be relevant to the recipient.

New Zealand – Unsolicited Electronic Messages Act 
The Unsolicited Electronic Messages Act regulates sending unsolicited commercial emails, including cold emails, with a New Zealand link, that is, emails that are sent to, from, or within New Zealand. According to the Act:

 the commercial emails cannot be sent without the recipient's clear or inferred consent;
 the commercial email must contain accurate information about the sender of the message, including valid contact information;
 the recipient must have a clear way to opt-out from receiving such emails.

Local personal data protection regulations and laws restricting the use of unsolicited emails may be subject to change. Cold email senders must keep up to date with the amendments to such regulations in order to always act in compliance with the law.

Cold email trends and best practices change with time. Many factors depend on the type of business and target recipients of the emails.

References 

Email
Direct marketing
Selling techniques